With a Smile (French: Avec le sourire) is a 1936 French comedy film directed by Maurice Tourneur and based on an original screenplay by Louis Verneuil. The film stars Maurice Chevalier and the title of the film is taken from one of his comic songs "With a Smile" (Avec le Sourire, 1907).

It was shot at the Joinville Studios in Paris. The film's sets were designed by the art directors Lucien Carré and Émile Duquesne.

Plot
A smooth talking but penniless vagrant (Maurice Chevalier) arrives in Paris and sets out to make it to the top with nothing more than his smile, charm and cunning mind.

Cast 

 Maurice Chevalier as Victor Larnois
 Marie Glory as Gisèle Berthier
 André Lefaur as Ernest Villary, le propriétaire du "Palace"
 Paule Andral as Valentine Villary, son épouse
 Marcel Vallée as Pascaud
 Léon Arvel as Templier
  as Fromentel, le directeur des Beaux-Arts
 Rivers Cadet as Albert, le chasseur du "Palace"
 Nicole de Rouves as l'épouse d'Albert
 Léon Morton as le maître d'école
 Milly Mathis as la caissière du "Palace"
 Jean Gobet as Bruzin
 Henri Houry as l'entraîneur
 Viviane Gosset as Suzy Dorfeuil, la vedette du "Palace"
 Lucien Callamand as Vauclin
 Jean Aymé as le duc de Ganges
 Anthony Gildès as le baron Wurtz
 Simone Sandre as la dactylo
 Georges Bever as le valet de pied
 Vincent Hyspa as le président du tribunal
 Robert Ozanne as un invité à la noce
 Georgé as Genneval
 Léon Morton as le maître d'école
 Robert Ozanne as un invité à la noce
 Rivers Cadet as le chasseur
 Eugène Stuber as l'amant de la femme du chasseur
 Jean Témerson as Cam

References

External links

1936 films
1936 comedy films
French comedy films
Films directed by Maurice Tourneur
French black-and-white films
Films shot at Joinville Studios
1930s French-language films
1930s French films